Cadophora is a genus of fungi belonging to the family Ploettnerulaceae.

The genus was first described by Karl Erik Torsten Lagerberg and Melin.

The genus has a cosmopolitan distribution.

Species:
 Cadophora fastigiata
 Cadophora finlandica
 Cadophora luteo-olivacea
 Cadophora malorum

References

Helotiales
Helotiales genera